Stewart Lyndon Woodford (September 3, 1835 – February 14, 1913) was an American attorney and politician who served as a member of the United States House of Representatives and Lieutenant Governor of New York.

Born in New York City, Woodford graduated from Columbia University in 1854, studied law, and attained admission to the bar. Becoming active in politics as a Republican, he served as Assistant United States Attorney for New York's Southern District from 1861 until volunteering for the Union Army in 1862. Woodford took part in the American Civil War as chief of staff to Quincy A. Gillmore, commander of the Department of the South, and as commander of the 103rd Colored Infantry Regiment. He attained the rank of colonel and the brevet rank of brigadier general.

Woodford ran successfully for lieutenant governor in 1866 and served from 1867 to 1868. After losing the 1870 race for governor, in 1872, Woodford was elected to the U.S. House, and he served a partial term. From 1877 to 1883, he served as United States Attorney for the Southern District of New York, and he served as Minister to Spain from 1897 until the start of hostilities during the Spanish–American War. Woodford died in New York City in 1913, and was buried in Stamford, Connecticut.

Life
He studied at Yale University and Columbia College (now Columbia University). At the latter, he graduated in 1854 and was a member of St. Anthony Hall. Then he studied law, was admitted to the bar in 1857, and commenced practice in New York City.

In 1860 he was chosen messenger of the electoral college of his state to convey to Washington its vote in favor of the presidency of Abraham Lincoln. In 1861 he was appointed U.S. assistant district attorney for the southern district of New York, holding this office about eighteen months.

In 1862 he entered the Union Army as a volunteer, serving until 1865, during which time he became in succession chief-of-staff to Gen. Quincy A. Gillmore in the Department of the South, and military commandant of Charleston, South Carolina, and Savannah, Georgia. He became colonel of the 103rd Regiment of U.S. Colored Infantry. On January 13, 1866, President Andrew Johnson nominated Woodford for the award of the honorary grade of brevet brigadier general of volunteers, to rank from May 12, 1865 and the U. S. Senate confirmed the award on March 12, 1866.

He was the Lieutenant Governor of New York from 1867 to 1868, elected in 1866 on the Republican ticket with Governor Reuben E. Fenton. In 1870, Woodford was the Republican candidate for Governor but was defeated by the incumbent Democrat John T. Hoffman.

In 1872, he was elected as a Republican to the 43rd United States Congress and served from March 4, 1873 to July 1, 1874. Also in 1872 he was chosen to be a presidential elector.

He was U.S. Attorney for the Southern District of New York from 1877 to 1883.

In June 1897, President William McKinley appointed Woodford to the post of Envoy Extraordinary and Minister Plenipotentiary to Spain. Spain severed diplomatic relations with the U.S. on April 21, 1898, and Woodford left his post the same day. The United States declared war on Spain as of that date by Act of Congress approved on April 25, 1898.

He died from heart disease at his home in New York City on February 14, 1913, and was buried in Stamford, Connecticut's Woodland Cemetery.

See also
Spanish–American War#Declaring war
Teller Amendment

Notes

Sources

 Eicher, John H., and David J. Eicher. Civil War High Commands. Stanford, CA: Stanford University Press, 2001. .
 Life Sketches of State Officers

1835 births
1913 deaths
Lieutenant Governors of New York (state)
Ambassadors of the United States to Spain
Columbia College (New York) alumni
19th-century American diplomats
Republican Party members of the United States House of Representatives from New York (state)
19th-century American politicians
Union Army colonels